Gutter may refer to:

Water discharge structures
 Rain gutter, used on roofs and in buildings
 Street gutter, for drainage of streets

Design and printing 
 Gutter, in typography, the space between columns of printed text
 Gutter, in bookbinding, page edges joined to the  spine
 Gutter (philately), the space between panes of postage stamps that creates configurations of "gutter pairs" or "gutter blocks"

Music 
 Gutters, in bowling and table shuffleboard, the trough hazards on either side of the playing lane into which the bowling ball or shuffleboard puck may fall
 "Gutter" (song), a song by Medina

See also 
 Guter (disambiguation)